23rd parallel may refer to:

23rd parallel north, a circle of latitude in the Northern Hemisphere
23rd parallel south, a circle of latitude in the Southern Hemisphere